The first orbital flight of an artificial satellite, Sputnik 1, was launched in October 1957, by the Soviet Union. In November, the second orbital flight took place. The Soviet Union launched the first animal to orbit the Earth, a dog, Laika, who died in orbit a few hours after launch.

 Thor, Atlas, and R-7 rocket families all have maiden flights this year, all three of which will have long legacies for the next 50+ years
 Australia and the UK go to space with sounding rockets; first space launches from Australia
 The R-12 makes its maiden flight
 The US makes its first orbital attempt and fails (Vanguard TV-3)

Launches

January

|}

February

|}

March

|}

April

|}

May

|}

June

|}

July

|}

August

|}

September

|}

October

|}

November

|}

December

|}

Orbital launch summary

By country

By rocket

By launch site

By orbit

Launch summary

By country

By rocket

See also
Timeline of spaceflight
Pre-1963 Designations Of U.S. Missiles And Drones

References

Footnotes

1957 in spaceflight
Spaceflight by year